Mount Arden  is a locality in the Australian state of South Australia.

Mount Arden  may also refer to the following:
Mount Arden, a peak in the Flinder Ranges in South Australia -  refer List of mountains in Australia#Flinders Ranges
Mount Arden,   a peak in Henderson, Nevada - refer KLAS-TV
Mount Arden, a pastoral lease in South Australia - refer  William Ranson Mortlock

See also
Arden Mounts, NASCAR driver